Nino Nini (died 21 January 1564) was a Roman Catholic prelate who served as Bishop of Potenza (1526–1564).

Biography
On 28 Nov 1526, Nino Nini was appointed by Pope Clement VII as Bishop of Potenza. He served as Bishop of Potenza until his death on 21 Jan 1564.

References

External links and additional sources
 (for Chronology of Bishops) 
 (for Chronology of Bishops)  

16th-century Italian Roman Catholic bishops
Bishops appointed by Pope Clement VII
1564 deaths